General Magruder may refer to:

Bruce Magruder (1882–1953), U.S. Army major general
Carter B. Magruder (1900–1988), U.S. Army general
John Magruder (general, born 1887) (1887–1958), U.S. Army brigadier general
John B. Magruder (1807–1871), Confederate States Army major general
Marshall Magruder (1885–1956), U.S. Army brigadier general